Roxita fletcheri is a moth in the family Crambidae. It was described by David E. Gaskin in 1984. It is found in Himachal Pradesh, India.

References

Crambinae
Moths described in 1984